Franco Chino (born 27 September 1948) is a retired Italian backstroke swimmer. He competed in the 100 m and 200 m events at the 1968 Summer Olympics, but failed to reach the finals.

References

1948 births
Living people
Italian male backstroke swimmers
Swimmers at the 1968 Summer Olympics
Italian male swimmers
Olympic swimmers of Italy
20th-century Italian people